Jeffery Deaver (born May 6, 1950) is an American mystery and crime writer. He has a bachelor of journalism degree from the University of Missouri and a J.D. degree from Fordham University and originally started working as a journalist. He later practiced law before embarking on a career as a novelist. He has been awarded the Steel Dagger and Short Story Dagger from the British Crime Writers' Association and the Nero Wolfe Award, and he is a three-time recipient of the Ellery Queen Reader's Award for Best Short Story of the Year and a winner of the British Thumping Good Read Award. His novels have appeared on bestseller lists around the world, including The New York Times, The Times, Italy's Corriere della Sera, The Sydney Morning Herald, and The Los Angeles Times.

Life and career
Deaver was born near Chicago in Glen Ellyn, Illinois. His mother was an artist, and his father an advertising writer. His sister Julie Deaver is an author of young adult novels. The book that inspired him to write was From Russia With Love, a James Bond novel by Ian Fleming.

Deaver's most popular series features Lincoln Rhyme, a quadriplegic detective, and NYPD Detective Amelia Sachs.

Deaver's 2001 book The Blue Nowhere features criminal hackers (one using social engineering to commit murder), as well as a law enforcement computer crime unit.  In this book, Deaver gives credit to Lee de Forest, the inventor of the Audion (also known as the triode tube), who is thus considered to have opened the world to electronic development.

Deaver edited The Best American Mystery Stories 2009.

Three of Deaver's novels have been made into films:
 A Maiden's Grave  made for TV as film Dead Silence 1997
 The Bone Collector released 1999
 The Devil's Teardrop  made for TV 2010

Additionally, The Bone Collector has been adapted as a television series, Lincoln Rhyme: Hunt for the Bone Collector. A Television series based on his novel "The Never Game" is also set to premiere in 2023.

Deaver also created the characters and—in a collaboration with 14 other noted writers—wrote the 17-part serial thriller The Chopin Manuscript narrated by Alfred Molina that was broadcast on Audible.com from September 25 to November 13, 2007. It is also available in print.

Deaver was chosen to write a new James Bond novel: Carte Blanche is set in 2011 and was published on May 25, 2011. He is the second American author to write Bond novels, after Raymond Benson.

Bibliography

Stand alone works
 Mistress of Justice (1992)
 The Lesson of Her Death (1993)
 Praying for Sleep (1994)
 A Maiden's Grave (1995)
 Speaking in Tongues (2000)
 The Blue Nowhere (2001)
 Garden of Beasts (2004)
 The Chopin Manuscript (2008) (collaborative fiction)
 The Bodies Left Behind (2008)
 Edge (2010)
 The October List (2013)

Rune Trilogy
 Manhattan Is My Beat (1988)
 Death of a Blue Movie Star (1990)
 Hard News (1991)

John Pellam (Location Scout series)
 Shallow Graves (1992)
 Bloody River Blues (1993)
 Hell's Kitchen (2001)

Lincoln Rhyme
 The Bone Collector (1997)
 The Coffin Dancer (1998)
 The Empty Chair (2000)
 The Stone Monkey (2002)
 The Vanished Man (2003) (includes an appearance by Parker Kincaid)
 The Twelfth Card (2005) (includes an appearance by Parker Kincaid)
 The Cold Moon (2006) (Introduces Kathryn Dance)
 The Broken Window (2008)
 The Burning Wire (2010)
 The Kill Room (2013)
 The Skin Collector (2014)
 The Steel Kiss (2016)
 The Burial Hour (2017)
 The Cutting Edge (2018)
 The Midnight Lock (2021)

Kathryn Dance
 The Sleeping Doll (2007) (includes a brief appearance by Lincoln Rhyme)
 Roadside Crosses (2009)
 XO (2012) (includes a brief appearance by Lincoln Rhyme)
 Solitude Creek (May 12, 2015)

Parker Kincaid
 The Devil's Teardrop (1999) (introduces Parker Kincaid, includes a scene with Lincoln Rhyme)

Colter Shaw
 The Never Game (2019)
 The Goodbye Man (2020)
 The Final Twist (2021)
 Hunting Time (2022)

James Bond
 Carte Blanche (2011)

Collections
 A Confederacy of Crime (2001)
 Twisted (2003)
 More Twisted (2006) (includes a story featuring Lincoln Rhyme)
Trouble in Mind (2014) (includes two stories featuring Lincoln Rhyme, one story featuring Kathryn Dance and one story featuring John Pellam)
 The Lineup: The World's Greatest Crime Writers Tell the Inside Story of Their Greatest Detectives (2009) (Includes a short Mysterious Profile about Lincoln Rhyme)

Anthologies
 Faceoff (2014) (includes Lincoln Rhyme vs. Lucas Davenport in “Rhymes With Prey,” by Jeffery Deaver and John Sandford
 Nothing Good Happens After Midnight (2020) edited by Jeffery Deaver (includes his story "Midnight Sonata") and includes Rhys Bowen, Linwood Barclay, Heather Graham, et al.

See also
 Lincoln Rhyme: Hunt for the Bone Collector

References

External links

 Official website

Living people
1950 births
American mystery writers
People from Glen Ellyn, Illinois
Nero Award winners
20th-century American novelists
21st-century American novelists
Novelists from Illinois
American male novelists
20th-century American male writers
21st-century American male writers